Wettin is a small town belonging to the municipality of Wettin-Löbejün in the Saale District of Saxony-Anhalt (Saxony-Ascania), Germany. It is situated on the River Saale, just north of Halle. It is known for Wettin Castle (German: Burg or Schloss Wettin), the ancestral seat of the House of Wettin, the former ruling dynasty of Saxony, Poland, the United Kingdom, Belgium, and Bulgaria. The town and its name are of Slavic origin.

Geography
Wettin lies in the Saalekreis (Saale District) of the eastern German federal state of Saxony-Anhalt, on the river Saale, which flows into the Elbe further north. Wettin belongs to the municipality of Wettin-Löbejün which borders Saxony-Anhalt's most populous city of Halle-on-the-Saale in the southeast. It further borders Petersberg and Salzatal in the Saale District, Gerbstedt in the district of Mansfeld-Südharz (Mansfield-Southern Harz), Könnern in the Salzlandkreis (Saltland District), and Südliches Anhalt in the district of Anhalt-Bitterfeld (Ascania-Bitterfield). The Saale District (German: Saalekreis), which Wettin-Löbejün is a part of, surrounds the city of Halle. The nearest international airport is Leipzig/Halle Airport in Schkeuditz, southeast of Halle. The municipality of Wettin-Löbejün further consists of the villages of Brachwitz, Döblitz, Domnitz, Gimritz, Löbejün, Nauendorf, Neutz-Lettewitz, Plötz, and Rothenburg. Most of these villages are of Slavic origin.

History

Wettin was first documented as Vitin civitas in a 961 deed issued by German king Otto I. The settlement thereafter was a burgward within the Saxon Eastern March, held by Dietrich I von Wettin, the progenitor of the dynasty. His descendants became Margraves of Lusatia in 1032 and of Meissen in 1123. In 1288 Wettin was acquired by the Magdeburg archbishop Eric of Brandenburg.

Mücheln The small village of Mücheln (not to be confused with the larger Mücheln near Merseburg) became part of Wettin and includes the restored old chapel of the Poor Fellow-Soldiers of Christ and of the Temple of Solomon (Knights Templar).

Lützkendorf  As bombing targets of the Oil Campaign of World War II, the Lützkendorf oil facilities 2 miles East of Mücheln included
a small Wintershall AG crude oil refinery (100,000 tons/yr), 
a Bergius process hydrogenation unit (125,000 tons/yr) for blending gasolines, 
a Fischer-Tropsch plant (80,000 tons/yr) to process heavier gasoline cuts from synthesized oil, and 
tankage for about 75,000 metric tons.

References

Former municipalities in Saxony-Anhalt
Wettin-Löbejün
Towns in Saxony-Anhalt
Oil campaign of World War II